The Johnston Gate is one of the several entrances to Harvard Yard in Cambridge, Massachusetts. Completed in 1889 after a Georgian Revival design by McKim, Mead, and White, it opens onto Peabody Street (often mistaken for Massachusetts Avenue, from which Peabody Street diverges nearby) just north of Harvard Square. Costing some $10,000, it was the gift of Samuel Johnston (Harvard College class of 1855). 

Each Harvard Commencement Day for several hundred years, the sheriffs of Middlesex and Suffolk Counties have arrived at Harvard Yard on horseback, preparatory to the Middlesex Sheriff's ritual calling of the celebrants to order. It has become traditional for them to enter via the Johnston Gate.

References

External links
 Harvard Gazette: Harvard Gates

Harvard University
Georgian Revival architecture in Massachusetts
Gates in the United States